One of only two species in its genus, Calibanus hookeri is a member of the family Asparagaceae native to Tamaulipas in Mexico, which can easily be mistaken in the wild for a boulder overgrown with grass tufts.

Description 
Calibanus hookeri forms a large caudex which has been known to reach diameters and heights of up to 2.6 feet. Atop the caudex sprouts extremely narrow greyish-green leaves that look like grass. Each leaf rosette grown from the caudex is believed to be a vegetatively produced independent plant which dies after fruiting to be replaced by a new one. Flower stalks grow to 2-3.3 feet tall with many branchings and bear tiny, greenish white flowers.

Cultivation 
Calibanus hookeri likes full sunlight and well drained and fertilized soils. Should be grown in a large and shallow container and should be kept outside in summer.

References 

The Complete Encyclopedia of Succulents by Zdenek Jezek and Libor Kunte.

Nolinoideae
Caudiciform plants
Taxa named by William Trelease